Daniel Doron Silverman (born 1963) is an American linguist and associate professor of linguistics at San José State University. He is known for his works on phonetics and phonology.

Books
 In progress. Degenerative Phonology.
 2017. A Critical Introduction to Phonology: Functional and Usage-Based Perspectives (2nd Edition). London: Bloomsbury Academic.
 2012. Neutralization (Rhyme and Reason in Phonology). Cambridge University Press.
 2006. A Critical Introduction to Phonology: of Sound, Mind, and Body. London/New York: Continuum.
 1997. Phasing and Recoverability. New York: Garland.
 1984. Deaf Not Daft: a Reappraisal of Language for the Deaf. Edinburgh: Scottish Workshop Publications.

References

External links
Daniel Silverman
Phasing and Recoverability

Phonologists
Living people
Linguists from the United States
1963 births
University of California, Los Angeles alumni
Phoneticians
Speech production researchers
Speech perception researchers
San Jose State University faculty
Academic staff of McGill University
University of Pennsylvania alumni